Cecil Kilborn (born 1902) was an English footballer who played inside left for Bradford City.

Kilborn was born in Desborough and played for Desborough Town until December 1919 when he was signed for Division One side Bradford City. But it was not until 8 October 1921 Kilborn made his debut in a 2–0 defeat against Middlesbrough, playing a total of 14 games that season as the club lost its top flight status. In 1922–23 Kilborn was the club's joint top goal-scorer with just five goals. He was released in 1924 after just 40 games with the club.

References

1902 births
Year of death missing
English footballers
English Football League players
Desborough Town F.C. players
Bradford City A.F.C. players
People from Desborough
Association football midfielders